The eleventh season of American talent show competition series America's Got Talent was broadcast on NBC from May 31 to September 11, 2016. Following the previous season, Howard Stern left the program and was replaced as a judge by the Got Talent creator, Simon Cowell. Stern's departure removed the contractual condition he had imposed for his involvement, leading to moving live round productions to the Dolby Theatre in Los Angeles. While open auditions were held in multiple cities, the judges' auditions were filmed within the Pasadena Civic Auditorium in Pasadena, California, an arrangement that would persist in future seasons.

Along with these change, the "Golden Buzzer" format was adjusted, and a planned break was made in the season's broadcast schedule between August 2–23 to avoid clashing with the network's live coverage of the 2016 Summer Olympics. The guest judges for this season's Judge Cuts stage included George Lopez, Reba McEntire, Ne-Yo and Louis Tomlinson.

The eleventh season was won by singer and ukuleleist Grace VanderWaal, with mentalist duo The Clairvoyants finishing second, and magician Jon Dorenbos placing third. During its broadcast, the season averaged around 11.44 million viewers. The eleventh season became prominent in the program's history for broadcasting a stunt on live television that went wrong, and almost resulted in the death of its performer.

Season overview 

Open auditions for the eleventh season began in late 2015 and were held within Detroit, New York City, Phoenix, Salt Lake City, Las Vegas, San Jose, San Diego, Kansas City, Los Angeles, Atlanta, Orlando, and Dallas. Online auditions were also accepted. Unlike previous years which had used multiple venues, sessions of the judges' auditions were held at a fixed venue, taking place around March 2016 at the Pasadena Civic Auditorium in Pasadena, California. This arrangement for auditions was continued in later seasons of the show. Actor George Lopez, singer and actress Reba McEntire, singer Ne-Yo and singer Louis Tomlinson were guest judges in the Judge Cuts stage of the competition.

Before the tenth season aired, Howard Stern announced it would be his last season on AGT during his radio show, as his work schedule in the coming year would make him unable to remain committed to performing as a judge. His announcement led to a replacement for the next season, after NBC renewed the program for another year. AGT creator, Simon Cowell, replaced Stern for the upcoming season. Cowell continued with his role of Britain's Got Talent in the same year.

Due to Stern's departure, the live rounds were no longer restricted to being held within New York at Radio City Music Hall. The live rounds for the new season would be brought back to Los Angeles, and held within the Dolby Theatre. Other than the change in venue, the "Golden Buzzer" could be used by the host, although only in the first stage of auditions (not during the Judge Cuts). Taking the 2016 Summer Olympics into account (which received coverage by the network), the season included not only a break between August 9–17, but also included two episodes of the Judge Cuts within two weeks to ensure the hiatus took place.

Of the participants who auditioned for this season, thirty-six secured a place in the live quarter-finals, with twelve quarter-finalists in each one. Among these included: opera singer Laura Bretan, singer and ukuleleist Grace VanderWaal, jazz singer Sal Valentinetti, singer Calysta Bevier and burlesque dancer Dorothy Williams, who had each received a golden buzzer from the main judges and host; magician Jon Dorenbos, contortionist and aerialist Sofie Dossi, malambo group Malevo and singer Jayna Brown, who had each received a golden buzzer from the guest judges; dance group Flip, video-mapping dance duo Sila Sveta and magician Steven Brundage, who were chosen as Wildcard quarter-finalists. About twenty-two quarter-finalists advanced and split between the two semi-finals, including juggling duo The Passing Zone (chosen as the Wildcard semi-finalist), with ten semi-finalists securing a place in the finals. These are the results of each participant's overall performance during the season:

 |  |  |  | 
 |  Wildcard Quarter-finalist |  Wildcard Semi-finalist
 Golden Buzzer - Auditions |  Golden Buzzer - Judge Cuts

  Ages denoted for a participant(s), pertain to their final performance for this season.

Quarter-finals summary
 Buzzed Out |  Judges' choice | 
 |  |

Quarter-final 1 (July 26) 
Guest Performers, Results Show: Mat Franco, and Paul Zerdin

  During the Results show, Deadly Games' picture was portrayed as Daniel Joyner during the Online Public Vote segment; it was later corrected.

Quarter-final 2 (August 2) 
Guest Performers, Results Show: Fitz and the Tantrums featuring Team iLuminate

Quarter-final 3 (August 23) 
Guest Performers, Results Show: Recycled Percussion, and Michael Phelps

  The Passing Zone were later appointed as the judges' WildCard semi-finalists.

Semi-finals summary
 Buzzed Out |  Judges' choice | 
 |  |

Semi-final 1 (August 30) 
Guest Performers, Results Show: The Illusionists

Semi-final 2 (September 6) 
Guest Performers, Results Show: Andra Day, and Blue Journey

Finals (September 13–14)
Guest Performers, Finale: Pitbull, LunchMoney Lewis

 |  |  | 

  Sofie Dossi, Laura Bretan and Viktor Kee conducted a joint routine for their second performance, and thus shared the same guest performers.
  The Clairvoyants and Jon Dorenbos conducted a joint routine for their second performance, and thus shared the same guest performers.
  Tape Face also involved a number of the other finalists as part of his second performance.

Ratings
The following ratings are based upon those published by Nielsen Media Research after this season's broadcast:

Specials

Incidents
Accidents are uncommon across the Got Talent franchise, but most are usually attributed towards performances that involve highly dangerous stunts and routines. As a matter of principle, production staff often engage a set of necessary precautions for any such routine that will be shown on live television, which can include having paramedics on standby, conducting the performance at another venue, or pre-recording the routine before it is due to be aired for an episode. However, staff on the eleventh season opted to allow for a dangerous stunt to be broadcast live to American viewers, performed by carnival daredevil Ryan Stock, which nearly became a fatal accident when a piece of equipment malfunctioned and nearly impaled the performer's throat with a crossbow bolt. Although he suffered no injuries, production staff were left to question why the performance had been allowed to take place, and altered all footage of the scene for online viewing as a direct result.

References

2016 American television seasons
America's Got Talent seasons